Nathan Lake (born 3 July 1992 in Cheltenham) is an English professional squash player. As of November 2022, he is ranked number 36 in the world.

References

1992 births
Living people
English male squash players